Odontotermes horni, is a species of termite of the genus Odontotermes. It is native to India and Sri Lanka. It attacks many dead, decaying trees and fertilized soil. Though nests on ground, they do not construct a termitaria. It is a pest of tea, coconut and sugarcane.

References

External links
A Preliminary Inventory of Subterranean Termites in the Premises of Faculty of Science, University of Kelaniya and the Potential of a Ponerine Ant Species, Neemazal-F and Citronella Oil in the Control of Two Termite Species
TERMITES ON CEYLON TEA ESTATES
Diversity of Wolbachia in Odontotermes spp. (Termitidae) and Coptotermes heimi (Rhinotermitidae) using the multigene approach
Sequence analysis of a few species of termites (Order: Isoptera) on the basis of partial characterization of COII gene.
Chaetotaxy of the termite, odontotermes assmuthi Holmgren (Isoptera: Termitidae)

Termites
Insects described in 1902
Insects of India